MACC may refer to:

 M.A.C.C., a rock band consisting of Mike McCready, Jeff Ament, Chris Cornell, and Matt Cameron
 Master of Accountancy, a graduate professional degree designed to prepare students for professional accounting, such as the Certified Public Accountant
 Malaysian Anti-Corruption Commission, a government agency in Malaysia that investigates corruption in the public and private sectors
 Metropolitan Anarchist Coordinating Council, an anarchist group based in New York City 
 Metro Atlanta Chamber of Commerce, the chamber of commerce for metro Atlanta, US
 Memorial Athletic and Convocation Center, a sports arena at Kent State University in Kent, Ohio, US
 Mississippian Art and Ceremonial Complex, a proposed renaming of the Southeastern Ceremonial Complex
 Moberly Area Community College, a community college based in Moberly, Missouri, US
 MACC (Multi Age Cluster Class), a gifted student program in Metro-Vancouver
 Marginal Abatement Cost Curve, a method of data visualisation showing costs and the scale of emissions reductions